What Grabs Ya? is the second studio album by Belgian rock band Triggerfinger, released on 25 February 2008 through Excelsior Recordings. Following 2004's Triggerfinger, the album managed to increase the band's popularity, but not enough for the band to break through in Belgium and the Netherlands.

On 11 July 2009, the album was re-issued, on which songs used to promote for the band's festivaltour were added to the track list.

Track listing

Bonus tracks released on re-issue.

Personnel
Ruben Block – lead vocals, guitar.
Paul Van Bruystegem – bass guitar.
Mario Goossens – drums.

External links
Band's official website

2008 albums
Triggerfinger albums